Marty Griffin may refer to:

 Marty Griffin (baseball) (1901–1951), an American pitcher in Major League Baseball
 Marty Griffin (journalist) (born 1959), American investigative reporter and radio talk show host
 Marty Griffin (environmentalist) (born 1920), American environmentalist and conservationist